The old Wishek City Hall is a historic building in Wishek, North Dakota. The one-story building was built in 1916. The Wishek City Council decided in April 2010 to sell the building to the Wishek Heritage Society for restoration. However, they later reversed their decision, believing that restoring the building was too much of a task for the new owner. The Historical Society sued the city, and the case is yet to be resolved.

References

External links
 and 

City and town halls on the National Register of Historic Places in North Dakota
Government buildings completed in 1916
National Register of Historic Places in McIntosh County, North Dakota
Mission Revival architecture in North Dakota
1916 establishments in North Dakota